(S)-iPr-PHOX, or (S)-2-[2-(diphenylphosphino)phenyl]-4-isopropyl-4,5-dihydrooxazole, is a chiral, bidentate, ligand derived from the amino alcohol valinol. It is part of a broader class of phosphinooxazolines ligands and has found application in asymmetric catalysis.

Preparation
(S)-iPr-PHOX is prepared using the amino alcohol valinol, which is derived from valine. The phosphine moiety may be introduced first, by a reaction between 2-bromobenzonitrile and chlorodiphenylphosphine; the oxazoline ring is then formed in a Witte Seeliger reaction. This yields an air stable zinc complex which must be treated with bipyridine in order to obtain the free ligand. Synthesis is performed under argon or nitrogen to avoid contact with air, however the final product is not air sensitive.

Uses
Iridium complexes incorporating (S)-iPr-PHOX have been used for asymmetric hydrogenation.

References

Ligands
Phosphines
Oxazolines